What's going on up there? is a one-hour documentary film by Maryanne Galvin that explores the topic of why space and space exploration is important from a number of perspectives, by considering the question "What's going on up there?"  Featuring a voice introduction by Leonard Nimoy and interviews with scientists and scholars at MIT, Yale, Sydney University, and UC San Francisco, attorneys, authors, entrepreneurs, economist, environmentalists, filmmakers, youngsters and average citizens—even a college student in Kuwait who wants to be the first Muslim woman in space—the documentary offers conversations on all sides of the space debate.

Awards and festival screenings
In competition at:
 the Beverly Hills HD Film Festival on December 31, 2006, LA, California;
San Diego International Children's Film Festival, April 22, 2007 Balboa Park
The Delray Beach Film Festival, March 17, 2007
DC Independent Film Festival, Washington DC, March 5, 2007
Yuri's Night April 13, 2007 at NASA-Ames, Mountain View, California
IndieCan Film Festival, Toronto Canada  May 10–12, 2007

External links

 

 
 
 

 

2006 films
Documentary films about outer space
2000s English-language films
American documentary films
Japanese documentary films
2000s American films
2000s Japanese films